Běleč is a municipality and village in Tábor District in the South Bohemian Region of the Czech Republic. It has about 200 inhabitants.

Administrative parts
Villages of Bzová and Elbančice are administrative parts of Běleč.

Geography
It lies in the Vlašim Uplands. The Blanice River flows along the western border.

Sights
Běleč is known for the ruin of Šelmberk Castle.

Gallery

References

Villages in Tábor District